Special Delivery is a 1927 American silent comedy film directed by Roscoe Arbuckle, starring Eddie Cantor, Jobyna Ralston and William Powell. It was written by Cantor, John F. Goodrich and George Marion Jr. (with Larry Semon, uncredited). It was released by Paramount Pictures. The film's copyright was renewed, so it entered the public domain on January 1, 2023.

Plot
Eddie, a mailman, is in love with waitress Madge but finds amongst his rivals for her affections the dishonest promoter Harold Jones. Eddie, who can't dance, impresses Madge at the postal ball by his energetic performance of the Black Bottom after a piece of ice falls down his shirt and wins a cup. He eventually unmasks Harold as a crooked swindler.

Cast
 Eddie Cantor as Eddie, The Mail Carrier
 Jobyna Ralston as Madge, The Girl
 William Powell as Harold Jones
 Donald Keith as Harrigan, The Fireman
 Jack Dougherty as Flannigan, a cop
 Victor Potel - Nip, a detective
 Paul Kelly as Tuck, another detective
 Mary Carr as The Mother
 Marilyn Cantor Baker as Extra (uncredited) (as Marilyn Cantor)
 Marjorie Cantor as Extra (uncredited)
 Tiny Doll as Baby on Eddie's Route (uncredited)
 Robert Livingston as Extra at Postal Ball (uncredited)
 Natalie Cantor Metzger as Extra (uncredited) (as Natalie Cantor)
 Spec O'Donnell as Office Boy (uncredited)

See also
 Fatty Arbuckle filmography

References

External links

1927 films
1927 comedy films
Silent American comedy films
American silent feature films
American black-and-white films
Films produced by B. P. Schulberg
Films directed by Roscoe Arbuckle
Paramount Pictures films
1920s American films